Jerold L. Trooien (born October 10, 1947) is an American real estate developer and former professional ice hockey player.

During the 1972–73 season, Trooien played two games in the World Hockey Association with the Chicago Cougars. He also played college hockey for the University of Minnesota Golden Gophers men's ice hockey team in 1966-67

Trooien later became a real estate developer. He announced a bid to run as an independent candidate in the 2018 United States Senate election in Minnesota

References

External links

1947 births
Living people
Albuquerque Six-Guns players
Binghamton Dusters players
Chicago Cougars players
Ice hockey people from Saint Paul, Minnesota
Toledo Hornets players
American men's ice hockey left wingers